= The Willing Muse =

1907 short story by Willa Cather

- Short story by Willa Cather
- Country: United States
- Language: English
- Genre: Short story

Publication
- Published in: Century
- Publication type: Illustrated monthly magazine
- Publication date: August 1907

"The Willing Muse" is a short story by Willa Cather. It was first published in Century in August 1907.

== Plot summary ==
Kenneth is leaving the fictional town of Olympia, Ohio and moving to New York City with his bethrothed Bertha. Before leaving for Paris, his friend Philip warns Bertha that Kenneth may not like the hurly-burly that she is trying to impose on him. However, they do get married. Philip comes back sometime later; Bertha has become very successful, whilst Kenneth has stopped writing. Philip is then to go to China for work; Kenneth is sad to hear from Harrison that Olympia is not the quiet town that it used to be, and muses that China must be quiet. Later, as Philip is on his way back to New York from Canton, he reads a letter from Harrison saying Kenneth has disappeared. Back in America, he meets with Harrison and tells him he saw their friend in China. The two men vow not to say it to anybody and remain trustworthy to their friend, who evidently needed to get away.

== Characters ==
- Kenneth Gray, a writer. He has written two books, Charles de Montpensier and The Wood of Ronsard
- Bertha Torrence, Kenneth's wife, a successful writer.
- Harrison, a music critic. He went to college with Kenneth and Philip.
- Philip, the narrator, a writer. He went to college with Kenneth and Harrison.
